Flávio Cardoso Santos (born October 12, 1980 in Itagi) is a Brazilian cyclist, who currently rides for Brazilian amateur team .

Major results

2008
 10th Prova Ciclística 9 de Julho
2009
 1st  Road race, National Road Championships
 2nd Overall Volta Ciclística Internacional do Rio Grande do Sul
2010
 6th Overall Giro do Interior de São Paulo
 7th Overall Tour do Brasil
1st Stage 3
2011
 Giro do Interior de São Paulo
1st Stages 1 & 2
 2nd Overall Tour do Brasil
1st Stage 3
2012
 2nd Overall Tour do Brasil
 3rd Time trial, National Road Championships
2013
 1st  Points classification Tour do Rio
 7th Overall Vuelta a Guatemala
2014
 1st Stage 1 Tour do Brasil
2015
 3rd Overall Vuelta del Uruguay
 5th Copa América de Ciclismo
 7th Overall Volta do Paraná
1st Stage 3
2016 
 1st  Road race, National Road Championships
2017
 3rd Overall Vuelta del Uruguay
1st Stage 3b (TTT)
2018
 3rd Time trial, National Road Championships
 5th Overall Vuelta del Uruguay
1st Stage 2a (TTT)

References

External links

1980 births
Living people
Brazilian male cyclists
Brazilian road racing cyclists
Sportspeople from Bahia